Abegarm (also Romanized as Ābegarm) is a village in Gavkan Rural District, in the Central District of Rigan County, Kerman Province, Iran. At the 2006 census, its population was 58, in 10 families.

References 

Populated places in Rigan County